José Cuneo Perinetti (September 11, 1887 - July 19, 1977) was an Uruguayan painter.

External links 
 http://www.rau.edu.uy/uruguay/cultura/cuneo.htm

1887 births
1977 deaths
People from Montevideo
Alumni of the Académie de la Grande Chaumière
Uruguayan people of Italian descent
20th-century Uruguayan painters
Uruguayan male artists
Male painters
20th-century Uruguayan male artists